This is a list of Muslim Academy Award winners and nominees.  It includes both practicing Muslims and those who have a Muslim background.

Academy Awards, popularly known as Oscars, are presented annually by the Academy of Motion Picture Arts and Sciences for artistic and technical merit in the film industry.

This list is current as of the 93rd Academy Awards ceremony, which was held on April 25, 2021.

Best Actor in a Leading Role

Best Actor in a Supporting Role

Best Actress in a Supporting Role

Best Documentary (Feature)

Best Documentary (Short Subject)

Best Live Action Short Film

Best Original Score

Best Original Song

Best Picture

Best Sound

Best Visual Effects

Best Writing (Adapted Screenplay)

Best Writing (Original Screenplay)

See also 

 List of Academy Award records
 List of Jewish Academy Award winners and nominees

References 

Lists of Academy Award winners and nominees by religion